Streptomyces eurythermus is a bacterium species from the genus of Streptomyces which has been isolated from soil from Cuanza in Angola. Streptomyces eurythermus produces pentenomycin I, pentenomycin II and angolamycin.

See also 
 List of Streptomyces species

References

Further reading

External links
Type strain of Streptomyces eurythermus at BacDive -  the Bacterial Diversity Metadatabase

eurythermus
Bacteria described in 1957